Stampede is a 1936 Canadian American Western film directed by Ford Beebe and starring Charles Starrett.

Plot
A cowboy out to find out who murdered his brother discovers that the killers may not be who he thought they were.

Cast
 Charles Starrett as Larry Carson 
 Finis Barton as Dale Milford 
 J.P. McGowan as Matt Stevens 
 William Millman as John Milford (as LeStrange Millman)
 Reginald Hincks as Sheriff 
 James McGrath as Henry Brooks 
 Arthur Kerr as Bill Gans 
 Jack Atkinson as Hodge 
 Michael Heppell as Kyle

See also
 Public domain film
 List of American films of 1936
 List of films in the public domain in the United States

References

Bibliography
 Pitts, Michael R. Western Movies: A Guide to 5,105 Feature Films. McFarland, 2012.

External links
 

1936 films
1936 Western (genre) films
American Western (genre) films
American black-and-white films
Canadian Western (genre) films
Columbia Pictures films
English-language Canadian films
Films directed by Ford Beebe
1930s American films
1930s Canadian films
1930s English-language films